Hancornia is a genus of flowering plant in the family Apocynaceae, first described as a genus in 1812. It is native to South America (Brazil, Peru, Bolivia, Paraguay). It contains only one known species, Hancornia speciosa, commonly called mangabeira, which produces fruits known as mangabas.

References

External links

 Flora Brasiliensis: Hancornia

Monotypic Apocynaceae genera
Trees of South America
Flora of Brazil
Flora of Bolivia
Flora of Paraguay
Flora of Peru
Rauvolfioideae